Sabiha Khanum (born Mukhtar Begum; 16 October 1935 – 13 June 2020), was a Pakistani film actress. She is also known as the "First Lady of Pakistani Cinema", and is often recognized for her role in Pakistani cinema during the 1950s and 1960s. The recipient of the Pride of Performance and Nigar Awards, she debuted in Lollywood films with Beli (1950), and also appeared in television dramas.

Some of her notable films include Do Ansoo (1950), Sassi (1954), Gumnaam (1954), Dulla Bhatti (1956), Sarfarosh (1956), Mukhra (1958), and Devar Bhabhi (1967).

She appeared mostly in Santosh Kumar's films playing protagonist roles opposite to her throughout the career. Sabiha and Santosh are sometimes known for their on-screen chemistry they shared and built following the 1950s and 60s films, in particular after they worked in Qatil (1955) film.

Early life
Sabiha Khanum was born Mukhtar Begum in a village near Gujrat in Punjab, Pakistan, to Mohammad Ali (Maahia) and Iqbal Begum (Baalo). She was raised in a conservative rural environment by her grandparents, but got her first acting opportunity on stage in Lahore, after moving there to be with her father.

A cultural delegation visited a cinema house in Sialkot, Pakistan in 1948. Mukhtar Begum (then a young girl in 1948), who was part of the delegation, sang the Punjabi song "Kithhay gae yoon pardesia way" from the film Sassi Punnoon (which starred Baalu and Aslam). Her performance was praised, and soon Mohammad Ali introduced his daughter to a stage drama writer and poet, Nafees Khaleeli. Noting her determination, Khaleeli offered her a role in the drama Buut Shikan, which she accepted. Nafees Khaleeli gave her the screen name of Sabiha Khanum.

Career
On Nafees Khaleeli's request, the film director Masood Parvez offered her a role in the film Beli (1950), giving Sabiha her debut as a film actress in 1950. Beli was also the first film of Masood Pervez as a director.

Next Sabiha played the role of 'Noori' in famous director/producer Anwar Kamal Pasha's Do Ansoo (1950), starring Santosh Kumar, Gulshan Ara and Sabiha. It was the first film to celebrate a Silver Jubilee in the new film industry of Pakistan. The film was based on an earlier Noor Jehan's hit Bhai Jaan (1945) and looks at how a man inadvertently ruins the lives of his wife and daughter. In fact, such was the impact of the film that it was re-made twice subsequently in Pakistan in Punjabi and Anjuman in Urdu.
 
Sabiha gained some more recognition in her next movie Aaghosh, directed by Murtaza Jilani, starring  Santosh, Sabiha, and Gulshan Ara. Her role, in the film 'Ghulam', released in 1953, directed by Anwar Kamal Pasha, with Santosh was also well received. Film directors admired her ability to improvise because she was talented and ambitious.

Her role in the film Gumnaam (1954) was also appreciated by the movie-goers. The movie was directed by Anwar Kamal Pasha, starring Seema, Sudhir and Sabiha Khanum. This film is a story about a mentally retarded girl, played by Sabiha, and is a pleasure to watch. She played the role of 'Nooran' in the romantic Punjabi film, Dulla Bhatti (1956) directed by M.S. Daar and this movie celebrated its Golden Jubilee at the Pakistani cinemas.

Sassi (1954) was based on the well-known tragic love story of Sassui Punnhun and went on to become the first Golden Jubilee film of Pakistan.

Sabiha's achievement along with Santosh Kumar in the following films is still noteworthy; Mukhra (1958), Muskurahat (1959), Rishta (1963), Hasrat (1958), Ishrat, Shikwa (1963), Teray Baghair (1959), Mauseeqar (1962), Dulhan, Kaneez (1965 film), Dewar Bhabi (1967), Shaam Dhalay (1960), Pak Daman (1969), Anjuman (1970), Sarfarosh (1956), Inteqaam (1955), Qatil (1955), Sawaal (1966), Commander (1968), and Mohabbat (1972). Her role in the film Anjuman (1970 film) was very well-liked, as were director Hasan Tariq's films Tehzeeb (1971) and Ik Gunah Aur Sahi (1975), director Zia Sarhadi's film Rah Guzar (1960), director Zahoor Raja's film Deewana (1964) and director Jameel Akhtar's film Aik Raat.

Altogether, Sabiha starred in 202 movies and mainly in Urdu language. She was awarded 6 Nigar Award and Pride of Performance Award on her acting career.

Sabiha ventured into television serials in the 1980s. The most notables are Dasht and Ehsaas.

She also sang two patriotic songs:

Sohni dharti Allah rakhay qadam qadam aabad tujhay
Jug jug jeeye mera pyara watan, lub pay dua hai dil mein lagun

In Anwar Maqsood's stage show Silver Jubilee in 1982, she rendered the song Yaad karoon tujhay shaam saweray from the film Mauseeqar (1962). As the final lyrics faded away that evening, the audience stood up and applauded.

Sabiha Khanum, who had been in the public eye for four decades, finally retired, and lived with her eldest daughter in the United States. Her other children also settled there.

Personal life 
Sabiha married co-star Santosh Kumar on 1 October 1958.

Santosh was already a married man with children. The two, after initial opposition from Sabiha's father, married during the making of Hasrat (1958). They starred together in 47 movies and played as a couple in the majority of them. They together had three children.

Illness and death
She lived with her daughter in Leesburg, Virginia until her death on 13 June 2020 at the age of 84. She had been hospitalized for the past few months due to kidney issues.

Filmography

Television series

Film

Other appearance

Awards and recognition
Sabiha Khanum has won several Nigar awards during her lifetime:

References

External links
 

1935 births
20th-century Pakistani women singers
2020 deaths
People from Gujrat District
Punjabi people
21st-century Pakistani actresses
Pakistani television actresses
Pakistani film actresses
Recipients of the Pride of Performance
Nigar Award winners
20th-century Pakistani actresses
Urdu-language singers
21st-century Pakistani women singers
People from Leesburg, Virginia
Actresses in Punjabi cinema
Actresses in Pashto cinema
Actresses in Urdu cinema